Richard Leslie "Richie" Morgan (born 3 October 1946) is a former Welsh professional footballer and manager.

Career

Born in Cardiff, Morgan was playing for Cardiff Corinthians before signing for Cardiff City in 1966. The majority of his time playing at Ninian Park was spent as understudy to club stalwart Don Murray. While at Cardiff, Morgan also played alongside his brother Peter who spent several years at the club before moving to Hereford United. He retired from playing in 1977 and joined the administrative staff at Cardiff.

Following the dismissal of Jimmy Andrews, he was appointed manager of the club in November 1978. He brought in several former Cardiff players to join his coaching staff, including Doug Livermore and Brian Harris. Despite spending a large amount of money on players the team struggled and began to fall down the Football League. In November 1981 he was moved upstairs to a role as general manager, working alongside Graham Williams. However, the team's form took a turn for the worse and the club nosedived down the table. Less than three months into the two-tier arrangement, the pair were sacked in February 1982. Morgan later went on to manage Barry Town, helping them to win several league championships.

Managerial statistics

References

External links

1946 births
Welsh footballers
Wales under-23 international footballers
Footballers from Cardiff
Cardiff City F.C. players
Cardiff City F.C. managers
English Football League players
Living people
Cardiff Corinthians F.C. players
Association football defenders
Welsh football managers